The 2016–17 SC Paderborn 07 season is the 110th season in the football club's history. After being relegated from the 2015–16 2. Bundesliga, Paderborn now play in the 3. Liga. They also participated in this season's edition of the domestic cup, the DFB-Pokal. The season covers a period from 1 July 2016 to 30 June 2017.

Players

Squad

Competitions

3. Liga

League table

Results summary

Results by round

Matches

DFB-Pokal

Westphalian Cup

References

External links
Official website 

SC Paderborn 07 seasons
Paderborn